Saarai Veeraju is a 2009 Indian Telugu-language drama film, written and directed by D. S. Kannan, an erstwhile assistant to S. S. Rajamouli and Krishna Vamsi. The film was dubbed in Tamil as Vettattam. The film, produced by P. R. K. Rao under the banner of Visalakshi Creations, stars Ajay, Remya Nambeesan and newcomer Madhulika.

Plot
The hero of the movie Ajay, starring as Veerraju, who's saving money so that he can go to Dubai. He almost loses his life trying to save a girl thereby making new enemies. On the way to Dubai, he is attracted to Preeti (Madhulika) an air hostess and falls for her. Veerraju's mission in Dubai is to kill a big shot named Vishnu and before he kills him he asks him if he remembers Narsipatnam and Dhanalaxmi (Remya Nambeeshan).

The backstory tells what happened in Narsipatnam and who Dhanalaxmi is. After the present story will tell what will Veerraju do when he needs to kill the other goons relating to Narsipatnam incident.

Cast
 Ajay as Saarai Veerraju
 Remya Nabeeshan as Dhanalaxmi
 Madhulika as Air hostess Preethi
 Mumaith Khan as a guest dancer for a song

Soundtrack

References

2009 films
2000s Telugu-language films
2000s Tamil-language films
Indian multilingual films
2009 multilingual films